

Events 
none listed

Publications 
Simon Boyleau –  for four, five, and six voices (Milan: Cesare Pozzo)
Joachim a Burck
 for five voices (Nuremberg: Ulrich Neuber & Johann vom Berg, Erben)
Song in honor of the wedding of Johann Gunther and Anna Antonia (Mühlhausen: Georg Hantzsch)
Andrea Gabrieli – First book of madrigals for five voices (Venice: Antonio Gardano)
Claude Goudimel
Seventh book of psalms in the form of motets for four voices (Paris: Le Roy & Ballard)
Eighth book of psalms in the form of motets for four voices (Paris: Le Roy & Ballard)
Francisco Guerrero – First book of masses for four and five voices (Paris: Nicolas du Chemin)
Jacquet of Mantua –  for four and five voices (Venice: Girolamo Scotto), a collection of Vesper hymns, published posthumously
Orlande de Lassus
Fourth book of motets for six and eight voices (Venice: Antonio Gardano)
 for four voices (Antwerp: Jean Laet)
Mattheus Le Maistre –  (Sacred and Secular German Songs) for four and five voices (Wittenberg: Johann Schwertel)
Francisco Leontaritis – First book of motets for five voices (Venice: Antonio Gardano)
Claudio Merulo – First book of madrigals for five voices (Venice: Claudio da Correggio & Fausto Bethanio)
Melchior Neusidler –  (two volumes)
Giovanni Pierluigi da Palestrina – 
Costanzo Porta
 for five voices (Venice: Claudio da Correggio & Fausto Betanio)
 for five voices (Venice: Claudio da Correggio & Fausto Betanio)

Births 
 March 30 – Carlo Gesualdo, Prince of Venosa, madrigalist, composer of church music (d. 1613)
 date unknown – Lucia Quinciani, Italian composer.

Deaths 
March 26 – Antonio de Cabezón, Spanish composer and organist of the Renaissance (b. 1510)
October 31 – Richard Edwardes, English choral musician, playwright and poet (b. 1525)

 
Music
16th century in music
Music by year